Herbert Henry Messenger, nicknamed "Dally" and sometimes "The Master" (12 April 1883 – 24 November 1959) was one of Australasia's first professional rugby footballers, recognised as one of the greatest-ever players in either code. He played for New South Wales in the first match run by the newly created New South Wales Rugby Football League, which had just split away from the established New South Wales Rugby Football Union.

According to his peers, the centre's greatest attributes were his unpredictability and astonishing physical co-ordination, coupled with a freakish ability to kick goals from almost any part of the ground. He was a teetotaller and non-smoker during his career and other than breakfast, Messenger would rarely eat before a match.

Early life
Messenger was born in the Sydney waterfront suburb of Balmain, New South Wales, and grew up in another of Sydney's waterfront suburbs, Double Bay, where his father, Charles Amos Messenger, a champion sculler, owned a boat shed. He also spent some time living with an aunt in South Melbourne, Victoria where he attended the Albert Park Public School. It was there he recalled playing Victorian rules football. He credited skills he learned at Albert Park as contributing to his later success at Rugby Union and Rugby League. Dally was one of eight children. His younger brother by seven years, Walter (Wally) also became an Australian representative footballer.

In Sydney, Messenger attended Double Bay Public School in the city's eastern suburbs. It was here that he initially honed his rugby skills, while also playing cricket and indulging in his other great sporting love, sailing. Messenger worked, too, at his father's boat shed. By this juncture, he had gained the nickname of "Dally". It derived from a prominent politician of the 1880s, the then Attorney-General of New South Wales, William Bede Dalley, whose most conspicuous physical feature was a splendid pot belly – an anatomical augmentation that Herbert Henry Messenger happened to boast, too, when he was a small child. Fortunately, little Herbert Henry shed his pot belly as he grew older, together with the "e" from the spelling of his nickname.

Rugby union 

Messenger first took up competitive rugby in 1900, playing for a local rugby union club called the Warrigals in a semi-social club competition. Over the next few years Messenger continued to play with the Warrigals, persistently rejecting calls by officials of the Eastern Suburbs RUFC to move up to the higher standard of Sydney's grade competition.  In 1904. aged 21, Messenger played no football at all. He decided to spend this year working for the Messenger family boatbuilding business in Double Bay.

In 1905 Messenger began playing for Easts in the club's second-grade team, but showed sufficient promise to earn promotion to the first-grade side on two occasions that season. In that same season, he also purportedly played Australian rules football club in a number of first-grade matches in the Sydney competition.

Messenger began the 1906 season in first grade with Easts as a 'standoff' (five-eighth). He swiftly won a following amongst the club's supporters due to his mesmeric ball skills, cheeky tricks, blistering acceleration and accurate short- and long-kicking game off either foot. Messenger moved to what would become his customary position of centre following his selection there for the New South Wales team in 1906. By the time of his Wallaby debut in 1907, he had made that position his own.

In his book Viewless Winds, the 1906 representative footballer Paddy Moran wrote that Messenger's play "was full of surprises, unorthodox, flash" and "directed largely by the unconscious mind". He said that Messenger "never became a slave to copybook practices" because his "instinct enabled him to see and take an opening in that operative second which is all-important". Moran compared him to Bradman in terms of their mutual ability to instantaneously co-ordinate their bodies into the right position in apparently ample time before the ball would arrive.

When talk of a professional rugby competition, or a Rugby League, was being aired, Messenger was instantly interested by the development.He was approached by a consortium that included Test cricketer, Victor Trumper with friend J. J. Giltinan, who knew getting Messenger on board would be a major boost for the new code. He signed on with the new professional code on Sunday 11 August 1907. As the premier rugby footballer of the time, Messenger's signing is considered an integral moment in the foundation of rugby league. After he became a professional rugby league footballer, Messenger's rugby games were struck from the record books of the New South Wales Rugby Union and not restored for 100 years.

Rugby league with the NZ All Blacks-"All Golds" 1907-08

Messenger played in the rebel series against a professional New Zealand team, the 'All Golds' as they were referred to, and was invited to tour England with the New Zealand professional side. It remains unclear whether this was a result of the form he showed in the series or if it had been agreed on as part of his sign-on fee with the new code. It was said, and believed as Messenger family folklore for years, that the signing of Messenger to rugby league was negotiated with Messenger's mother Annie, and the promised amount for playing, at first, in three All Golds' games, was 50 pounds (based on increases in average earnings, this would be approximately £18,210 in 2015).

It was in the North of England that Messenger became more acquainted with the new game. By the completion of the tour Messenger had topped the tour aggregates by more than 100 points.

The 1908 inaugural rugby league season

On arrival back in Australia, Messenger played with the Eastern Suburbs club of the newly formed New South Wales Rugby Football League (NSWRFL), although a heavy representative schedule saw him play only a handful of matches for the club. Messenger's popularity helped showcase the new game and the NSWRFL took full advantage of this. He was selected to play in the first ever trans-Tasman test, which was the debut match of the Australia national rugby league team. In rugby league's first year, besides playing for his club, Messenger made representative appearances for Metropolis (Sydney), New South Wales and Australia as well as for New Zealand and, in one case, Queensland, he also represented Australasia.
Following two heavy defeats, Messenger agreed to play for Queensland in a third match against New Zealand. The match ended in a 22–22 draw, with Messenger scoring nine of the 22 points.

The 1908 Interstate rugby league series saw the first ever match between New South Wales and Queensland and Messenger scored a goal for the Blues in their 43-0 victory over the Maroons in Sydney. During the 1908 New Zealand Māori rugby league tour of Australia Messenger was selected to play for New South Wales and Sydney against the tourists.

The Pioneer Kangaroos 1908-1909

Towards the end of the 1908 season Messenger was again selected to tour England, this time with the first Kangaroos, or 'Pioneers'. He is listed on the Australian Players Register as Kangaroo No. 10.

Having toured with the New Zealand professional team the previous year, Messenger was well known in the North of England and on arrival attained celebrity status. Placards bearing the words 'Messenger Will Play' were erected outside of grounds.  Messenger was offered contracts by leading soccer clubs, including Glasgow Celtic, Newcastle United and Tottenham Hotspur, but refused them.

Messenger captained Australia in the first two tests of the tour, missing the third through a knee injury incurred after regular field goal attempts. On tour Messenger was credited with numerous goals from the other side of half way, including one from the sideline on his own 25-yard line that appeared in earlier versions of the 'Guinness Book of World Records' as measuring over 80 yards (73m). Another from over 75 yards is mentioned in an English newspaper under the heading 'A Wonderful Kick' "." Quite a sensation was caused at last Saturday's football match when Mr Messenger kicked the ball from the 75 yards' mark and secured a goal....."
In the second test Messenger is said to have scored one of the greatest individual tries ever witnessed in Test rugby league. At the end of the tour Messenger had again topped the aggregates, this time by just under 100 points.

Club seasons 1909-1913
Returning home from the tour with injury and following a hectic schedule over the past few years, he elected to sit out most of the 1909 NSWRFL season, playing in just a few representative matches towards the end of the year. Messenger also rejected an offer to play with English club, Warrington, during the Australian off-season that year. Messenger was captain of Australia when they hosted the 1910 Great Britain Lions tourists.

The 1911 season has been acclaimed as Messenger's greatest. In 21 matches played he amassed a then record total of 270 points. In one interstate match for NSW he scored 32 points (from four tries and 10 goals). That record has only been equalled in recent years, with tries now being worth 4 points as opposed to 3. He amassed a total of 72 points for the three match series.

Recently married Messenger stood down from the 1911–12 Kangaroo tour of Great Britain, leading his club Eastern Suburbs to its first premiership. In the semi-final that year against South Sydney Messenger scored 20 of Easts' 23 points. For each of the three consecutive seasons 1910, 1911 and 1912, he was the NSWRFL's top point scorer. In 1911 he overtook Arthur Conlin's record for the most points scored in an NSWRFL (101); Messenger's eventual total of 379 stood as the new career record until it was bettered by Harold Horder in 1918.

After retirement from representative football, he led his side to a second premiership in 1912 and followed that with a third consecutive premiership in 1913. Easts were given permanent possession of the NSWRFL's first trophy, the Royal Agricultural Society Shield. On announcement of his retirement, the Eastern Suburbs club presented the shield to Messenger in appreciation.

He was awarded Life Membership of the New South Wales Rugby League in 1914.

Life after football
In addition to his rugby prowess, Messenger was a talented cricketer, canoeist and sailor. After the end of his rugby league career, he ran a couple of hotels in Sydney and Manilla, New South Wales and a banana plantation in Mount Buderim, Queensland. He later worked as a carpenter in the NSW Department of Public Works.

None of his various business opportunities proved to be successful.  In his later years, he lived in the New South Wales Rugby League's club in Phillip Street. It was reported in the press that Messenger had suffered a heart attack on 18 November 1959 and he died in Gunnedah six days later. His body was returned to Sydney for a large funeral and was buried on 26 November 1959 at the Eastern Suburbs Memorial Park : Anglican section FM DDD - Grave 321

Accolades
The Courtney Goodwill Trophy, international rugby league's first trophy, was presented initially in 1936 and depicted Messenger, along with three other pioneering greats of the code, namely Jean Galia (France), Albert Baskiville (New Zealand) and James Lomas (Britain).

The Dally M. Medal is awarded annually to Australian rugby league's best player, as judged by an expert panel of commentators, whose votes are tallied at the conclusion of each regular playing season. A stand at the Sydney Cricket Ground was also named after Messenger, in recognition of his many outstanding games of club and representative football. In 2003 he was admitted into the Australian Rugby League Hall of Fame.

In 2004, the Royal Agricultural Society Shield held by Messenger's family became part of the National Museum of Australia collection.

In 2007, a century after he was shunned by rugby union for switching to rugby league for 180 pounds, his playing record was formally reinstated.

In February 2008, Messenger was named in a list of Australia's 100 greatest ever players (1908–2007) commissioned by the NRL / ARL to celebrate the code's Australian centenary year. Messenger went on to be named as an interchange player in Australian rugby league's Team of the Century. Announced on 17 April 2008, the team was a selection panel's majority choice for each of the 13 starting positions and four interchange players.

In 2008 New South Wales announced their rugby league team of the century also, naming Messenger on the wing.

Messenger was immortalised in 2008 by a life-size bronze sculpture created by artist Cathy Weiszmann and erected outside the Sydney Football Stadium. The statue forms the second sculpture in an envisaged 10-part series for the Sydney Cricket Ground Trust's Basil Sellers Sports Sculptures Project.

Joining fellow pre-WWII greats Dave Brown and Frank Burge, Messenger was inducted as a Rugby League Immortal in 2018, along with recent greats Norm Provan and Mal Meninga.

Notes

Published sources 
 Fagan, Sean / Messenger, Dally III (2007) The Master – The Life and Times of Dally Messenger, Australia First Sporting Superstar, Hachette Livre, Sydney  (pbk)
 Fagan, Sean (2005 & 2007) The Rugby Rebellion: Pioneers of Rugby League, RL1908, Sydney
 Heads, Ian (1992) True Blue, Ironbark, Sydney
 Various Authors (1997) Oxford Companion to Australian Sport, Oxford University Press, Melbourne
 Whiticker, Alan (2004) Captaining the Kangaroos, New Holland, Sydney
 Moran, Herbert (1939) Viewless Winds – the recollections and digressions of an Australian surgeon P Davies, London

External links 

 
 Australian Rugby League Hall of Fame
 A Personal History told by Dally Messenger III
 Death of The Master
 Dally Messenger in Rugby Union's Classic Wallabies

1883 births
1976 deaths
Australian rugby union players
Australian rugby league players
Australian people of English descent
Rugby league players from Sydney
New Zealand national rugby league team players
Sydney Roosters players
Sydney Roosters captains
Australia national rugby league team players
Dual-code rugby internationals
Australia national rugby league team captains
Australasia rugby league team players
1959 deaths
Sport Australia Hall of Fame inductees
Australia international rugby union players
Rugby league centres
New South Wales rugby league team players
Queensland rugby league team players
Rugby union wings
Rugby union players from Sydney